Olumide is both a masculine given name and surname. It may refer to:

Given name
Olumide Durojaiye (born 1992), Nigerian footballer
Olumide Olamigoke (born 1990), Nigerian triple jumper
Olumide Oyedeji (born 1981), Nigerian-British basketball player
Stephen Olumide Arigbabu (born 1972), German basketball player
Olumide Oworu  Nigerian actor and model

Surname
Folabi Olumide, Nigerian academic and surgeon
Eunice Olumide (born 1987), Scottish model
Joseph Olumide (born 1987), Nigerian footballer
Oresegun Olumide, Nigerian artist

References

Yoruba-language surnames 
Yoruba given names 
Nigerian names
African masculine given names
Surnames of African origin